Catharina Serafin, was a Prussian lady who had an enchondroma removed from her cardiac region, leaving the chest wall open except from a thin skin layer. This allowed the German physician Hugo von Ziemssen in 1892 to do the first cardiac pacing experiments ever, giving understanding to how the heart works electrically.

References

Pulmonology and respiratory therapy organizations